In molecular biology, glutamine amidotransferases (GATase) are enzymes which catalyse the removal of the ammonia group from a glutamine molecule and its subsequent transfer to a specific substrate, thus creating a new carbon-nitrogen group on the substrate. This activity is found in a range of biosynthetic enzymes, including glutamine amidotransferase, anthranilate synthase component II, p-aminobenzoate, and glutamine-dependent carbamoyl-transferase (CPSase). Glutamine amidotransferase (GATase) domains can occur either as single polypeptides, as in glutamine amidotransferases, or as domains in a much larger multifunctional synthase protein, such as CPSase. On the basis of sequence similarities two classes of GATase domains have been identified: class-I (also known as trpG-type) and class-II (also known as purF-type). Class-I GATase domains are defined by a conserved catalytic triad consisting of cysteine, histidine and glutamate. Class-I GATase domains have been found in the following enzymes: the second component of anthranilate synthase and 4-amino-4-deoxychorismate (ADC) synthase; CTP synthase; GMP synthase; glutamine-dependent carbamoyl-phosphate synthase; phosphoribosylformylglycinamidine synthase II; and the histidine amidotransferase hisH.

References 

Protein domains